The 1999 FIBA Europe Under-16 Championship (known at that time as 1999 European Championship for Cadets) was the 15th edition of the FIBA Europe Under-16 Championship. The cities of Polzela, Celje and Laško, in Slovenia, hosted the tournament. Yugoslavia won the trophy for the second time in a row.

Teams

Qualification

There were two qualifying rounds for this tournament. Twenty-four national teams entered the qualifying round. Fifteen teams advanced to the Challenge Round, where they joined Greece, Israel and France. The remaining eighteen teams were allocated in three groups of six teams each. The three top teams of each group joined Yugoslavia (title holder), Russia (runner-up) and Slovenia (host) in the final tournament.

Preliminary round
The twelve teams were allocated in two groups of six teams each.

Group A

Group B

Knockout stage

9th–12th playoffs

Championship

5th–8th playoffs

Final standings

Team roster
Jovan Stefanov, Bojan Bakić, Aleksandar Gajić, Strahinja Zgonjanin, Nemanja Matović, Miloš Pavlović, Dušan Đorđević, Mirko Kovač, Miloš Nišavić, Srđan Bulatović, Ivan Andonov, and Tomislav Tomović.
Head coach: Petar Rodić.

References
FIBA Archive
FIBA Europe Archive

FIBA U16 European Championship
1999–2000 in European basketball
1999 in Slovenian sport
International youth basketball competitions hosted by Slovenia